Marcus Koh is a Singaporean yo-yo performer and competitor born in 1993. He won the world championships in the 1A division in 2011. He has been sponsored by the yo-yo companies Turning Point and Auldey. In 2015, he started his own company, called Throw Revolution.

Early career
Koh started playing with yo-yos in 2003 when he was 10 years old, inspired by the TV cartoon "Super Yo-yo". Koh won the national title in the 1A division in Singapore in 2009. He won the world title in the 1A division on August 6, 2011.

Results

References

Singaporean people of Chinese descent
1993 births
People from Singapore
Yo-yo performers
Living people